Marina Dimitrijevic (born 1981) is an American politician from Wisconsin and the Milwaukee Common Council member for the 14th Aldermanic District, serving since 2020. Previously, Dimitrijevic served on the Milwaukee County Board of Supervisors from 2004 to 2020, including as board chairwoman from 2012 to 2015. A Democrat, Dimitrijevic has also worked as the executive director of the Wisconsin Working Families Party.

Early life and education
Dimitrijevic ( / Dimitrijević) is the daughter of Serbian immigrants. She is a graduate of Bay View High School and holds a master's degree in nonprofit management from the University of Wisconsin–Milwaukee.

Career
The youngest person elected to the Board, Dimitrijevic has served as a county supervisor since 2004, when she was elected to represent District 4, centered on the Bay View neighborhood. In 2014, Dimitrijevic sought the Democratic nomination for Wisconsin State Assembly District 19. She was endorsed by Milwaukee Mayor Tom Barrett and U.S. Representative Gwen Moore but was defeated by legislative aide Jonathan Brostoff.

Dimitrijevic is considered a political opponent of former Milwaukee County Executive Chris Abele.

Tapped to lead the Wisconsin branch of the Working Families Party, Dimitrijevic announced on July 24, 2015 that she would resign as board chairwoman effective July 30.

In 2019, Dimitrijevic announced a bid for the Milwaukee Common Council. She was endorsed by Nikiya Dodd and outgoing incumbent Tony Zielinski and defeated challenger Jason Auerbach in the April general election to become an alderwoman for Milwaukee's 14th District.

References

1981 births
Living people
University of Wisconsin–Milwaukee alumni
Women in Wisconsin politics
People from Milwaukee County, Wisconsin
County supervisors in Wisconsin
Wisconsin Democrats
American people of Serbian descent
Milwaukee Common Council members
21st-century American women politicians
21st-century American politicians